Repentance is a stage in Christian salvation where the believer acknowledges and turns away from sin. As a distinct stage in the ordo salutis its position is disputed, with some theological traditions arguing it occurs prior to faith and the Reformed theological tradition arguing it occurs after faith.  In Catholic theology, Lutheran theology, Orthodox theology and Anglican theology, repentance plays a key role in Confession and Absolution.

Origins
In the Hebrew Bible, the term repentance comes from the Hebrew word group that means "turn away from". David Lambert believes that "It is in the writings of rabbinic Judaism and early Christianity that it attains the status of a technical term, a basic item of an emerging religious lexicon".

In the New Testament, John the Baptist called for repentance during his speeches. Jesus also called for repentance when he proclaimed the Gospel for Salvation. It was a focal point in the preaching of Peter and Paul the Apostle.

In the New Testament μετανοέω/metanoeo can mean remorse but is generally translated as a turning away from sin (Matthew 3:2). Theologically, 'repentance', the turning away from sin is linked to a corresponding turn to faith in God.

Emanuel Swedenborg and Jonathan S. Rose explain how repentance in the church as a whole is used to take away the serious evils that God cannot overlook. Swedenborg and Rose explain how "acts of repentance include any and all actions that result in our not willing, and consequently not doing, evil things that are sins against God." For repentance to be achievable one must think of it using their will or real self and the thinking must be done by their will. Swedenborg and Rose refer to John the Baptist to describe how he was performing baptism of repentance. John the Baptist would preach repentance along with the other disciples and the Lord himself along with performing the baptisms. If people repented then their sins were forgiven and they were welcomed into the church.

Theology

Catholicism
In Roman Catholic theology repentance is fundamental to forgiveness.

This is elaborated on by Rev. George Hay who in his catechism answers the question, What are the principal parts of which true repentance is composed?
The principal parts of true repentance are these three: (1.) A sincere regret and sorrow of heart for our having offended so good a God by sin. (2.) A firm and determined resolution of never offending Him again, followed by an effectual change of life and manners. (3.) A voluntary punishing of ourselves for the sins we have committed, in order to repair the injury done to God by sin, and to satisfy, in some measure, His offended justice."

For Catholics, where there is mortal sin, use of the Sacrament of Reconciliation must follow.

Protestantism

Lutheran

The Augsburg Confession (known in Latin as Confessio Augustana) is the primary confession of faith used in the Lutheran Church. It is one of the most important documents of the Protestant Reformation. It divides repentance into two parts:
 "One is contrition, that is, terrors smiting the conscience through the knowledge of sin;"
 "The other is faith, which is born of the Gospel, or of absolution, and believes that for Christ's sake, sins are forgiven, comforts the conscience, and delivers it from terrors."

Reformed

In the Reformed tradition John Calvin wrote that repentance "may be justly defined to be a true conversion of our life to God, proceeding from a serious fear of God, and consisting in the mortification of the flesh and of the old man, and in the vivification of the Spirit." He further said that "it will be useful to amplify and explain the definition we have given; in which there are three points to be particularly considered".

In the first place, when we call repentance 'a conversion of the life to God', we require a transformation, not only in the external actions, but in the soul itself; which, after having put off the old nature, should produce the fruits of actions corresponding to its renovation.... 
In the second place, we represented repentance as proceeding from a serious fear of God. For before the mind of a sinner can be inclined to repentance, it must be excited by the knowledge of the Divine judgment.
It remains for us, in the third place, to explain our position, that repentance consists of two parts—the mortification of the flesh and the vivification of the spirit.... Both these branches of repentance effects our participation of Christ. For if we truly partake of his death, our old man is crucified by its power, and the body of sin expires, so that the corruption of our former nature loses all its vigor.... If we are partakers of his resurrection, we are raised by it to a newness of life, which corresponds with the righteousness of God." [Quotes from A Compend of the Institutes of the Christian Religion by John Calvin edited by Hugh T. Kerr, The Westminster Press-Philadelphia 1939.]

Methodism
In Methodist theology:

Nondenominational Christianity
In Nondenominational Christianity, especially such churches aligned with evangelicalism, repentance is necessary for salvation and new birth. It is the subject of special invitations during sermons and services. It is also part of Christian life and the process of sanctification.

Latter Day Saint movement

Members of the Church of Jesus Christ of Latter-day Saints believe in repentance much in the same way other Abrahamic religions do. They believe repentance is "a change of mind and heart that gives us a fresh view about God, about ourselves, and about the world" (Gospel Topics). Here are few key points of doctrine:
 We sin and become unclean, disqualifying us from entering God's kingdom. We can become clean once again and enter God's presence.
 It is through Jesus Christ that we can become whole again. (Helaman 5:11)
 The Atonement of Jesus Christ was planned from the beginning. (2 Nephi 2:7)
 Baptism helps bring about the remission of sins.
 We aren't expected to be perfect, just to offer up a broken heart and a contrite spirit.

References

Repentance
Christian soteriology
Christian terminology